Irbesartan, sold under the brand name Avapro among others, is a medication used to treat high blood pressure, heart failure, and diabetic kidney disease. It is a reasonable initial treatment for high blood pressure. It is taken by mouth. Versions are available as the combination irbesartan/hydrochlorothiazide.

Common side effects include dizziness, diarrhea, feeling tired, muscle pain, and heartburn. Serious side effects may include kidney problems, low blood pressure, and angioedema. Use in pregnancy may harm the baby and use when breastfeeding is not recommended. It is an angiotensin II receptor antagonist and works by blocking the effects of angiotensin II.

Irbesartan was patented in 1990, and approved for medical use in 1997. It is available as a generic medication. In 2020, it was the 148th most commonly prescribed medication in the United States, with more than 4million prescriptions.

Structure activity relationship 
Irbesartan has the common structural features seen within the Angiotensin-II Receptor blockers or ARB medications. The medicine has an extended diphenyl group with a tetrazole at the 2-prime position. At the 4'prime position, the molecule has a diazaspiro04-none, which is on a methyl.

Medical uses
Irbesartan is used for the treatment of hypertension. It may also delay progression of diabetic nephropathy and is also indicated for the reduction of renal disease progression in patients with type 2 diabetes, hypertension and microalbuminuria (>30 mg/24 h) or proteinuria (>900 mg/24 h).

Combination with diuretic
Irbesartan is also available in a fixed-dose combination formulation with hydrochlorothiazide, a thiazide diuretic, to achieve an additive antihypertensive effect.  Irbesartan/hydrochlorothiazide combination preparations are marketed under various brand names.

Society and culture

Brand names 
It was developed by Sanofi Research (part of Sanofi-Aventis). It is jointly marketed by Sanofi-Aventis and Bristol-Myers Squibb under the brand names Aprovel, Karvea, and Avapro.

Recalls

In 2018, the US Food and Drug Administration (FDA) reported that some versions of the angiotensin II receptor blocker medicines (including valsartan, losartan, irbesartan and other "-sartan" drugs) contain nitrosamine impurities.

References

External links
 
 

Angiotensin II receptor antagonists
Sanofi
Bristol Myers Squibb
Tetrazoles
Biphenyls
Lactams
Spiro compounds
Nitrogen heterocycles
Wikipedia medicine articles ready to translate